Sitka is an unincorporated community with U.S. Post Office centered on KY Route 201, in Johnson County, Kentucky, United States. 
It is located at an elevation of 712 feet (217 m). Sitka's ZIP code is 41255.

References

 

Unincorporated communities in Johnson County, Kentucky
Unincorporated communities in Kentucky